Where in Time is Carmen Sandiego? may refer to:

 Where in Time Is Carmen Sandiego? (video game), a 1989 Carmen Sandiego Time game 
 Carmen Sandiego's Great Chase Through Time (previously known as Where in Time Is Carmen Sandiego?), a 1997 Carmen Sandiego Time game 
 Where in Time Is Carmen Sandiego? (game show), a PBS gameshow

See also
 Carmen Sandiego (disambiguation)
 Where in the World Is Carmen Sandiego? (disambiguation)